Gevelsberg (Westphalian: Gievelsbiärg) is a town in the district of Ennepe-Ruhr-Kreis, in North Rhine-Westphalia, Germany.

Geography

The town lies in the valley of the river Ennepe in the Süder Uplands, which is part of the Rhenish Massif. Gevelsberg lies about halfway between Wuppertal and Hagen, and is part of the industrial Ruhr Region. The lowest elevation is the Ennepe river at Vogelsang and highest is the Hageböllinger Kopf.

Division of the town
 Asbeck
 Berge
 Gevelsberg
 Silschede

History

The town has a history of nearly 785 years. The archbishop of Cologne Engelbert II of Berg was killed on November 7, 1225 by his cousin Frederick of Isenberg in Gievilberch. As a consequence, a monastery of atonement (German: Sühnekloster) was established at the place of Engelbert's death and became the origin of the settlement resulting in today's Gevelsberg.

The population grew strongly in the 19th century, when many small industries related to iron processing were developed.

Coat of arms
Gevelsberg received its coat of arms (a brick gable on a green hill, and a cogwheel indicating its industry) by decree of the Prussian Department of the Interior in 1903. In the mid-1950s a city wall was added to the coat of arms.

Politics
The current mayor of Gevelsberg is Claus Jacobi of the Social Democratic Party (SPD) since 2004. In the most recent mayoral election was held on 13 September 2020, Jacobi was re-elected with 87.1% of votes, defeating Felix Keßler, who was endorsed by the CDU, Free Voters, The Greens, and FDP.

City council 

The Gevelsberg city council governs the city alongside the Mayor. The most recent city council election was held on 13 September 2020, and the results were as follows:

! colspan=2| Party
! Votes
! %
! +/-
! Seats
! +/-
|-
| bgcolor=| 
| align=left| Social Democratic Party (SPD)
| 8,675
| 62.9
|  0.6
| 27
|  1
|-
| bgcolor=| 
| align=left| Christian Democratic Union (CDU)
| 2,022
| 14.7
|  4.1
| 6
|  2
|-
| bgcolor=| 
| align=left| Alliance 90/The Greens (Grüne)
| 1,730
| 12.5
|  6.3
| 5
|  2
|-
| bgcolor=| 
| align=left| Alternative for Germany (AfD)
| 685
| 5.0
| New
| 2
| New
|-
| bgcolor=| 
| align=left| The Left (Die Linke)
| 339
| 2.5
|  1.9
| 1
|  1
|-
| bgcolor=| 
| align=left| Free Democratic Party (FDP)
| 334
| 2.4
| New
| 1
| New
|-
! colspan=2| Valid votes
! 13,785
! 98.2
! 
! 
! 
|-
! colspan=2| Invalid votes
! 246
! 1.8
! 
! 
! 
|-
! colspan=2| Total
! 14,031
! 100.0
! 
! 42
! ±0
|-
! colspan=2| Electorate/voter turnout
! 25,727
! 54.5
! 
! 
! 
|-
| colspan=7| Source: City of Gevelsberg
|}

Transport

Gevelsberg is connected to the national road network by the A1 autobahn and the B 7 and B 234 roads.

The municipality is served by several regional train lines of the Verkehrsverbund Rhein-Ruhr. There are four stations on the local line from Hagen to Wuppertal (Gevelsberg-Knapp, Gevelsberg Hauptbahnhof, Gevelsberg-Kipp and Gevelsberg West) served by the S 8 trains of the Rhein-Ruhr S-Bahn. Three hourly Regional-Express services, the Wupper-Express (RE 4) between Dortmund and Aachen via Düsseldorf, the Rhein-Münsterland-Express (RE 7) between Krefeld and Münster via Cologne and Hamm and the Maas-Wupper-Express (RE 13) between Venlo (Netherlands) and Hamm via Mönchengladbach, stop at Ennepetal (Gevelsberg) station.

Twin towns – sister cities

Gevelsberg is twinned with:
 Vendôme, France (1973)
 Szprotawa, Poland (1996)
 Butera, Italy (2004)

Festivities
Gevelsberg Kirmes – held every last weekend of June
Quellenfest – every year on Ascension Thursday to Sunday

Notable people
Elisabeth Höngen (1906–1997), operatic mezzo-soprano
Michael Cramer (born 1949), politician (The Greens), member of the European Parliament
Klaus-Peter Thaler (born 1949), cyclist
Alexandra Popp (born 1991), footballer
Lena Oberdorf (born 2001), footballer 
Lukas Klostermann (born 1996), footballer

External links

Official website

References

Ennepe-Ruhr-Kreis